Bethesda is a town and community on the River Ogwen and the A5 road on the edge of Snowdonia, in Gwynedd, north-west Wales. It is the fifth-largest community in Gwynedd.

History 
The settlement's ancient name was Cilfoden, formerly known as Glanogwen. In 1823, the Bethesda Chapel was built and the town subsequently grew around and later named after it. The chapel was rebuilt in 1840.

The town grew around the slate quarrying industries; the largest of the local quarries is the Penrhyn Quarry. At its peak, the town exported purple slate all over the world. Penrhyn Quarry suffered a three-year strike led by the North Wales Quarrymen's Union between 1900 and 1903 – the longest industrial dispute in British history. This led to the creation of the nearby village of Tregarth, built by the quarry owners, which housed the families of those workers who had not struck. It also led to the formation of three co-operative quarries, the largest of which Pantdreiniog dominated the town for many years.

The A5 road runs through Bethesda and marked the border between Lord Penrhyn's land, and the freehold land. Most of the town is to the east and northeast of the road, with housing packed onto the hillside in irregular rows, built on the commons. On the current high street, all the public houses are found on the south side of the road.

Railways 
The narrow gauge Penrhyn Quarry Railway opened in 1801 to serve Penrhyn Quarry. It connected the quarry with Port Penrhyn on the coast and operated until 1962. In 1884, a branch of the London and North Western Railway's network from Bangor was opened, along with a station for the town. The line closed to passengers in 1951 and to freight in 1963.

The trackbed of the Penrhyn Quarry Railway towards Porth Penrhyn is taken over by the Lôn Las Ogwen cycle path.

Modern Bethesda 
The population of Bethesda was 4,735 people in 2011. Current opportunities for employment in the town are limited: there are a few manufacturing businesses; most businesses are in the low-paid service sector and hospitality industry. For employment with higher earning potential, residents tend to commute to towns along the North Wales coast.

Ysgol Dyffryn Ogwen ("Ogwen Valley School") is a bilingual comprehensive school, with 374 pupils, established in 1951.

Governance 
At the local level, Bethesda elects thirteen community councillors to Bethesda Community Council, from the community wards of Gerlan, Ogwen and Rachub.

Prior to 1996 Bethesda was a county electoral ward to Gwynedd County Council. Since 2004, two county wards have covered Bethesda, namely Gerlan and Ogwen which each elect one county councillor to Gwynedd Council.

Architecture 

The architecture and layout of the town are largely utilitarian. Most of the buildings are constructed of stone with slate roofs. Some are constructed wholly of slate blocks, although such buildings tend to suffer from damp and structural slippage because the very flat and smooth surfaces of slate do not bind well to mortar.

The town has 40 Grade II listed buildings, including three pubs, in addition to the substantial and imposing Grade I listed Nonconformist Jerusalem Chapel

The upper parts of Carneddi, Cilfodan and Tan y Foel owe more to stone quarrying on the nearby hills rather than slate quarrying that supported the lower end of the town. At the eastern limits, the town is bounded by the rising land of the Carneddau mountains which form some of the more remote landscapes of Snowdonia. Much of Bethesda once consisted of discrete villages such as Gerlan, Rachub, Tregarth, Llanllechid and Braichmelyn; their names are retained as districts of the town.

Religion 
Bethesda is noted for both the number of chapels (mostly dating from the 1904-1905 Welsh Revival) in the town. The town was named after the Bethesda Chapel, which was recently converted into residential flats.

Commerce and industry 
Llanllechid, on the outskirts of Bethesda, is the home of the Popty Bakery, the origins of which date back to the bakery opened by O. J. Williams in the early 1900s. The product range focuses mainly on traditional Welsh cakes and Bara Brith and these lines are retailed throughout Wales and parts of England through outlets including Aldi, Asda, Co-Op, Morrisons and Tesco.

Public houses 
There are ten pubs in the Bethesda area, not including Tregarth. The Douglas Arms, on the High Street, was named after the family which owned the nearby Penrhyn Quarry. Other pubs include the Bull, The Kings Head, Y Sior ("The George"), The Victoria Arms, and the Llangollen.

The village has its own microbrewery known as Cwrw Ogwen. It currently manufactures one beer named Cwrw Caradog, named after the writer Caradog Prichard.

Language and culture 
The dominant language of the town is Welsh and can be seen written and heard spoken in most settings. According to the United Kingdom Census 2001, 77.5% of the residents are Welsh-speaking (with some parts being over 80.0%+), higher than the average for both Gwynedd and Wales as a whole. In successive census returns (1901 and 1911) Bethesda had the highest percentage of Welsh speakers of its respective shire (Caernarfonshire) and of any district in Wales (with 1,500 monolingual Welsh speakers in 1901).

The S4C series Amdani! (a play on words that can mean "go for it!" and "about her") was based on a fictitious women's rugby team in Bethesda, and many of the location shots were filmed in the area. The series was based on the novel of the same name, by Bethan Gwanas, who lived in the town.

In June 2012 Tabernacl (Bethesda) Cyf., a non-profit co-operative based in the town was awarded a grant of around £1 million to renovate Neuadd Ogwen, a performance venue on the High Street. It was due to reopen as a community arts centre in June 2013.

In the 1970s and 1980s, Bethesda developed a reputation as a hub of musical creativity. Jam sessions and small home studios abounded alongside a burgeoning pub rock scene. As well as the now well-established 'Pesda Roc' festival, Bethesda has nurtured the Welsh language bands Celt, Maffia Mr Huws and experimentalists Y Jeycsyn Ffeif. In more recent years it continues to spring up bands from the local community such as Radio Rhydd.

Gallery

Notable people 

 Bobby Atherton (1876–1917), footballer with 135 club caps and 9 for Wales
 Richard Bell (1859–1930), politician and MP; formed North Wales Quarries Ltd. which owned three slate quarries in Bethesda
 Ellis Davies (politician) (1871–1939), politician and lawyer.
 Idris Foster (1911–1984), Jesus Professor of Celtic Studies at the University of Oxford
 David Ffrangcon-Davies (1855–1918), a Welsh operatic baritone.
 Bethan Gwanas (born 1962), author with an informal style of writing, lived and worked in Bethesda.
 Esyllt Harker (1947–2014), singer, actress and storyteller
 Frederick Llewellyn-Jones (1866–1941), politician and MP
 Leila Megàne (1891–1960), a mezzo-soprano opera singer.
 John Ogwen (born 1944), actor, born in nearby Sling, now lives in Bangor 
 Gwenlyn Parry (1932–1991), a dramatist and author of several plays in Welsh
 William John Parry (1842–1927) businessman, politician, author and first general secretary of the North Wales Quarrymen's Union.
 Peter Prendergast (1946–2007), Welsh landscape painter
 Caradog Prichard (1904–1980), Welsh novelist and poet, author of Un Nos Ola' Leuad
 Margaret Pritchard a former Welsh radio and TV broadcaster 
 Goronwy Roberts, Baron Goronwy-Roberts (1913–1981), politician, MP and peer
 James Edmund Vincent (1857–1909), barrister, journalist and author

See also 
 Bethesda Branch Line

References

External links 

 
 www.geograph.co.uk : photo of Bethesda and surrounding area
 www.ogwen.wales : Bethesda website.

 
Towns in Gwynedd
Former wards of Wales